Edival Marques Quirino Pontes also known as Netinho (born October 11, 1997) is a Brazilian taekwondo athlete. He won the silver medal in the men's lightweight event at the 2022 World Taekwondo Championships held in Guadalajara, Mexico. He won a gold medal at the 2014 Youth Olympic Games in the under 63 kg weight category.

He represented Brazil at the 2020 Summer Olympics.

References

External links

Living people
1997 births
Brazilian male taekwondo practitioners
Taekwondo practitioners at the 2014 Summer Youth Olympics
Youth Olympic gold medalists for Brazil
Pan American Games medalists in taekwondo
Pan American Games gold medalists for Brazil
Taekwondo practitioners at the 2019 Pan American Games
Pan American Taekwondo Championships medalists
Medalists at the 2019 Pan American Games
Taekwondo practitioners at the 2020 Summer Olympics
Olympic taekwondo practitioners of Brazil
World Taekwondo Championships medalists
21st-century Brazilian people